Dhanush (born 1983) is an Indian Tamil film actor, director and writer.

Dhanush may also refer to:
 Dhanus (disambiguation), several entities in ancient Indian culture
 Dhanush (missile), a missile developed by the Indian Navy
 Dhanush (howitzer), an artillery piece used by the Indian Army
 Aishwarya R. Dhanush (born 1982), Indian film director
 Inspector Dhanush, a 1991 Indian film

See also 
 Dhanu (disambiguation)